Harold Harris may refer to:
Harold Arthur Harris (1902–1974), British classical scholar
Harold D. Harris (1903–1984), United States Marine Corps officer
Harold R. Harris (1895–1988), American test pilot
Harold Harris (actor) in 1986 film That's Life! (film)
Harold Harris, director of 1999 Christmas film The Nuttiest Nutcracker

See also
Harry Harris (disambiguation)